David Buick (29 April 1848 – 18 November 1918) was a New Zealand politician of the Reform Party. A New Zealand-born sheep breeder, he represented farming interests in Parliament. He owned racing horses and won various high-profile races. He died in office in the 1918 influenza epidemic.

Early life
Buick was born in Wellington in 1848. His father, William Buick, had come to Wellington in 1841 on the Arab from England. Buick senior farmed in the Hutt Valley, with Buick junior taking over the farm in 1867. On 5 June 1876, he married Mary Ann (Polly) Buick (née Hill), daughter of I. M. Hill from Nelson.

In 1881, Buick junior bought land in the Manawatu's Kairanga Block. Living at a time when many New Zealanders were immigrants, Buick was proud of his birth in the colony and referred to it on occasions.

Political career
In 1885, he started making submissions to the Road Board over access issues. In 1887, he joined the Road Board and within months, he became its chairman. The Road Board ran into financial difficulties over a court case concerning stormwater run off, and ratepayers thus petitioned for the establishment of the Manawatu Land Drainage Board (MLDB), which was established in 1894. In December 1895, Buick became the MLDB's second chairman and held that position until 1898.

He first stood for Parliament in the  against the incumbent Frederick Pirani in the Palmerston electorate (since 1938 called the Palmerston North electorate) and came within 50 votes of unseating him (1553 versus 1603 votes for Buick and Pirani, respectively). Pirani, who represented the Liberal Government, fell out with Premier Richard Seddon. Buick, who contested the election as a conservative candidate, came a distant third.

The next election contested by Buick was the 1908 general election. The 1908 general election was held under the Second Ballot Act, contested by three candidates. Buick, Wood and William Milverton received 2675, 2626 and 123 votes, respectively. As Buick did not receive an absolute majority, a second ballot was required. Buick won the second ballot with a majority of 93 votes (2811 versus 2718 votes for Buick and Wood, respectively).

In 1909, the opposition started calling itself the Reform Party, and Buick contested the  under that banner. The Liberal Party put Robert McNab forward. Milverton contested the electorate again, and William Thomson was the fourth candidate.  Buick won just over half the votes (3374 of 6732 votes cast, with 3367 votes required to achieve an absolute majority) and a second ballot was thus not required.

The  was again contested by four candidates. Buick stood again for the Reform Party. Jim Thorn represented the Social Democratic Party. Hugh Crabb was the official candidate for the Liberal Party and the Mayor of Palmerston North, Jimmy Nash, was also a member of the Reform Party. Buick, Thorn, Crabb and Nash received 2739, 1686, 1476 and 1077 votes, respectively. He represented the electorate until his death.

His political interests centred on farming issues. Buick had a conservative outlook, but rejected that label. During the war, he was a stern critic of conscientious objectors.

Life outside politics and death
Buick was a successful breeder of Romney Marsh sheep. Buick bred race horses and they won several high-profile races, which certainly helped his political career. He played a fundamental role in establishing the freezing works in Longburn. For some time, he was the president of the Manawatu Caledonian Society.

Buick's wife died on 1 August 1917. Buick had a serious case of influenza in April 1918. He died in Wellington on 18 November 1918 during the height of the influenza epidemic of 1918. A fellow MP, Alfred Hindmarsh, had died of influenza only five days before him. After Buick's death, the Prime Minister, William Massey, adjourned the House of Representatives as 18 other members were also ill. Buick was buried in Palmerston North at the Terrace End Cemetery, survived by his six children. His parents, William Buick (d. 1880) and Agnes Buick (d. 1897), are buried in the same family plot as David Buick and his wife.

References

1848 births
Deaths from Spanish flu
Reform Party (New Zealand) MPs
New Zealand farmers
Unsuccessful candidates in the 1896 New Zealand general election
Unsuccessful candidates in the 1899 New Zealand general election
Members of the New Zealand House of Representatives
New Zealand MPs for North Island electorates
19th-century New Zealand politicians